The 2000 Big East Conference baseball tournament was held at Commerce Bank Ballpark in Bridgewater, New Jersey. This was the sixteenth annual Big East Conference baseball tournament. The  won their second tournament championship, and second in three years, to claim the Big East Conference's automatic bid to the 2000 NCAA Division I baseball tournament.

Format and seeding 
The Big East baseball tournament was a 6 team double elimination tournament in 2000. The top six regular season finishers were seeded one through six based on conference winning percentage only. Notre Dame claimed the second seed by winning the season series over Seton Hall.

Bracket

Jack Kaiser Award 
Bobby Brownlie was the winner of the 2000 Jack Kaiser Award. Brownlie was a freshman pitcher for Rutgers.

References 

Tournament
Big East Conference Baseball Tournament
Big East Conference baseball tournament
Big East Conference baseball tournament
Baseball in New Jersey
Bridgewater Township, New Jersey
College sports in New Jersey
Sports competitions in New Jersey
Sports in Somerset County, New Jersey
Tourist attractions in Somerset County, New Jersey